Spencer Mugnier (born 1 December 1972 in Chamonix, Haute-Savoie, France) is a French curler.

He participated at the 2002 Winter Olympics where the French men's team finished in tenth place.

Awards
Collie Campbell Memorial Award: 2001.

Teams

References

External links

Living people
1972 births
People from Chamonix
Sportspeople from Haute-Savoie
French male curlers
Curlers at the 2002 Winter Olympics
Olympic curlers of France